Attainment is the third album led by saxophonist Charles Brackeen which recorded in 1987 and released on the Swedish Silkheart label.

Reception 

Comparing it to his other albums recorded for the same label The Penguin Guide to Jazz notes "Attainment is the least satisfying, but only because there are no solos on par with "Worshippers" and "Story". However it does include the fascinating sax/bass/drums trio "House of Gold"." In his review for AllMusic, Scott Yanow states "Brackeen's intense sound has a soul of its own, and his playing on the four lengthy originals (with strong contributions by bassist Fred Hopkins, drummer Andrew Cyrille and the underrated cornetist Olu Dara) is quite original. Intense yet fulfilling music".

Track listing 
All compositions by Charles Brackeen.

 "Attainment" – 8:53
 "Prince of Night" – 13:20
 "New Stand" – 10:03
 "House Of Gold" – 10:29
 "Yogan Love" – 13:08 Bonus track on CD release

Personnel 
Charles Brackeen – tenor saxophone, voice
Olu Dara – cornet, voice, berimbau
Fred Hopkins – bass, toy drum, voice
Andrew Cyrille – drums, congas, voice
Dennis González – pao de chuva, voice

References 

1988 albums
Charles Brackeen albums
Silkheart Records albums